Barbara Florian (born 1931) is a retired Swedish film actress known for her work in Italian cinema.

Selected filmography
 The Devil in the Convent (1950)
 Carcerato (1951)
 Rome-Paris-Rome (1951)
 Red Moon (1951)
 Girls Marked Danger (1952)
 Altri tempi (1952)
 I tre corsari (1952)
 Jolanda, the Daughter of the Black Corsair (1953)
 First Love (1959)

References

Bibliography
Small, Pauline. Sophia Loren: Moulding the Star. Intellect Books, 2009.

External links

1931 births
Living people
20th-century Swedish women artists
Swedish emigrants to Italy
Actresses from Stockholm